The , or , is a railway system in Kyoto Prefecture and Hyōgo Prefecture, Japan operated by Willer Trains Inc. headquartered in Miyazu, Kyoto.

Company
The operating company Willer Trains Inc. is a subsidiary of Willer Alliance Inc. Willer Trains is the first railway company in the Willer group, which is primarily operating in the industry of bus services.

Lines

The Kyoto Tango Railway consists of the following three lines:
Miyafuku Line 
Miyatoyo Line (Brand name of the Miyazu Line between Miyazu and )

The operation as the Kyoto Tango Railway began on April 1, 2015 succeeding the train operation function of the Kitakinki Tango Railway, which still owns the tracks and rolling stocks of the railway. The railway provides access to Amanohashidate Station, where Amanohashidate, one of Japan's three scenic views, is located.

Special trains
The company operates one restaurant train called "KURO-MATSU", as well as two sightseeing trains called "AKA-MATSU" and "AO-MATSU".

References

External links

NHK Train Cruise - Legends along the Kyoto Tango Railway 

Rail transport in Kyoto Prefecture
Rail transport in Hyōgo Prefecture
Railway companies of Japan
Railway companies established in 2015
2015 establishments in Japan
Japanese third-sector railway lines